Bokn is a municipality in Rogaland county, Norway. It is located in the traditional district of Haugaland. The administrative centre of the municipality is the village of Føresvik, the only urban area in Bokn. Other villages in Bokn include Arsvågen, Trosnavåg, and Loten. The island municipality is mostly located on the three islands of Ognøya, Vestre Bokn, and Austre Bokn. All three main islands are connected to the mainland via a network of bridges.

The  municipality is the 348th largest by area out of the 356 municipalities in Norway. Bokn is the 342nd most populous municipality in Norway with a population of 855.

General information

The municipality of Bokn (historically spelled Bukken) was established in 1849 when it was separated from the large municipality of Skudenes. Initially, Bokn had 1,035 residents. The borders of Bokn have not changed since that time.

Name
The municipality is named after the islands of Austre Bokn and Vestre Bokn. The name is probably very old and its meaning is unknown. Before 1889, the name was written "Bukken".

Coat of arms
The coat of arms was granted on 8 August 1986. The arms are blue with six silver/white circles in the shape of a triangle. The blue background represents the sea and the 6 circles represent silver coins, which symbolize the richness from the sea since it is an island municipality and therefore dependent on fishing and sailing.

Churches
The Church of Norway has one parish within the municipality of Bokn. It is part of the Haugaland prosti (deanery) in the Diocese of Stavanger.

Buildings and structures

Geography

The island municipality of Bokn is located on the northern side of the Boknafjorden, at the southern end of the Karmsundet strait. The island of Karmøy lies to the west and the mainland of Tysvær is located to the northeast. The island municipality of Kvitsøy lies south of Bokn and the island municipality of Rennesøy lies to the southeast of Bokn.

Bokn is one of the smallest municipalities in Rogaland, consisting of three main islands: Ognøya, Austre Bokn, and Vestre Bokn. There are also some smaller, uninhabited islands surrounding the main islands.

The islands are rugged with many small hills with small lakes in the valleys. The hills are largely covered with heather, but bushes and trees are increasingly competing, especially birch.

Climate

Government

All municipalities in Norway, including Bokn, are responsible for primary education (through 10th grade), outpatient health services, senior citizen services, unemployment and other social services, zoning, economic development, and municipal roads. The municipality is governed by a municipal council of elected representatives, which in turn elect a mayor.  The municipality falls under the Haugaland og Sunnhordland District Court and the Gulating Court of Appeal.

Municipal council
The municipal council of Bokn is made up of 17 representatives that are elected to four year terms. Currently, the party breakdown is as follows:

Transportation

The three islands of Bokn are now linked via bridges to Tysvær municipality on the mainland. These bridges are part of the European route E39 highway and they are part of the main coastal highway between the cities of Stavanger and Bergen. There is a ferry connection southward across the Boknafjorden to Rennesøy which is connected by road to Stavanger. The planned Rogfast undersea tunnel will directly connect both sides of the Boknafjorden from Stavanger to Bokn, with a planned completion date of 2023.

Economy
Apart from a factory producing various tanks made of glassfiber-reinforced plastic (Bokn Plast), there is no industry on the islands other than some fish farming. People have traditionally lived off fishing and farming, but more recently, some work has been in the North Sea petroleum industry. Tourism is likely to play a bigger part in the future.

Notable people 
 Asbjørn Kloster (1823 in Vestre Bokn – 1876) social reformer, minister, teacher, publisher and leader of the Norwegian temperance movement
 Lars Elisæus Vatnaland (1892 in Bokn – 1983) a Norwegian politician, Mayor of Bokn municipality 1925 to 1934

References

External links

Municipal fact sheet from Statistics Norway 

 
Municipalities of Rogaland
1849 establishments in Norway